OpenQM is a MultiValue database originally developed by Ladybridge Systems in the United Kingdom and subsequently acquired by Zumasys. The primary product architect is Martin Phillips.

OpenQM history
OpenQM was first developed in 1993 as an in-house embedded database. It was released as a full featured runtime and development environment in 2001, initially for Windows and subsequently for Linux. Although primarily a commercial product, an open-source General Public Licence version was released in 2004 for Linux to allow developers to experiment with ideas for possible inclusion in the commercial product. In late 2008, a community-driven site formed to direct a fork of the GPL release named ScarletDME. The original open source implementation was deprecated.

In 2015, Ladybridge Systems announced that cloud solutions provider Zumasys in Irvine, California, was appointed as the worldwide distributor for the OpenQM MultiValue database product with design and development of the software remaining with the UK-based, Ladybridge Systems. Zumasys acquired full ownership rights to OpenQM in January 2019 and Martin Phillips became a Zumasys employee at the same time, continuing as product architect and primary developer.

The database products owned by Zumasys (OpenQM and jBASE) were sold to Rocket Software in October 2021.

Unique Multi-Value features
OpenQM is a multivalue database, and, as such, shares many aspects in common with similar Pick-descended databases.  It also has a number of features not found in most other commercial MV databases, such as auto-sizing of database files, 'binary clean' execution of QMBasic, and, perhaps uniquely in the MV world, object, class and exception handling support in Basic. Support for arbitrarily multi-dimensional data collections was added in 2014 to extend the data model beyond the three dimensions supported by most multi-value systems. This functionality makes creation, parsing or processing of JSON strings very easy, simplifying web development.

References

External links
 OpenQM, official site
 Ladybridge OpenQM Page
 (Unofficial) OpenQM Wiki
 Pick's presentation in French

Free database management systems